Eukaryotic translation initiation factor 3 subunit D (eIF3d) is a protein that in humans is encoded by the EIF3D gene.

Function 

Eukaryotic translation initiation factor-3 (eIF3), the largest of the eIFs, is a multiprotein complex composed of at least ten nonidentical subunits. The complex binds to the 40S ribosome and helps maintain the 40S and 60S ribosomal subunits in a dissociated state. It is also thought to play a role in the formation of the 40S initiation complex by interacting with the ternary complex of eIF2/GTP/methionyl-tRNA, and by promoting mRNA binding. The protein encoded by this gene is the major RNA binding subunit of the eIF3 complex.

Interactions 

EIF3D has been shown to interact with PHLDA1 and EIF3A.

EIF3D has also been shown to interact with c-Jun mRNA via a non-canonical mechanism. Instead of the EIF4G protein acting as a cap-binding protein to mediate translation, EIF3D has been shown to be a cap binding protein for certain mRNAs such as c-Jun which has structures at the 5' UTR inhibiting binding of EIF4G and promoting binding of EIF3D. EIF3D as a cap binding protein has been thought of as critical to regulating gene expression under cell stress such as during glucose deprivation. For translation of c-Jun under glucose starved conditions, the cap binding activity of EIF3D increased by 10-fold.

See also 
Eukaryotic initiation factor 3 (eIF3)

References

Further reading